Qasabeh-ye Sharqi Rural District is a rural district (dehestan) in the Central District of Sabzevar County, Razavi Khorasan Province, Iran. At the 2006 census, its population was 7,664, in 2,129 families.  The rural district has 17 villages.

References 

Rural Districts of Razavi Khorasan Province
Sabzevar County